Jerry Lambert may refer to:

 Jerry Lambert (actor) (born 1957), American actor
 Jerry Lambert (jockey) (1940–2015), American jockey
List of characters in the Predator series#Jerry